The 2015 Tampere Open was a professional tennis tournament played on clay courts. It was the 34th edition of the tournament which was part of the 2015 ATP Challenger Tour and the 2015 ITF Women's Circuit. It took place in Tampere, Finland, on 20–26 July 2015.

Men's singles main draw entrants

Seeds 

 1 Rankings as of 13 July 2015.

Other entrants 
The following players received wildcards into the singles main draw:
  Vladimir Ivanov
  Micke Kontinen
  Patrik Niklas-Salminen
  Henrik Sillanpää

The following players received entry with a protected ranking:
  José Checa-Calvo 
  Javier Martí

The following players received entry from the qualifying draw:
  Harri Heliövaara 
  Axel Michon 
  Anton Pavlov
  Alexander Vasilenko

The following player received entry as a lucky loser:
  Ristomatti Lanne

Women's singles main draw entrants

Seeds 

 1 Rankings as of 13 July 2015.

Other entrants 
The following players received wildcards into the singles main draw:
  Ella Leivo 
  Milka-Emilia Pasanen
  Roosa Timonen
  Tanja Tuomi 

The following players received entry from the qualifying draw:
  Natalia Belova 
  Polina Golubovskaya 
  Mariella Minetti 
  Tatiana Nikolaeva 
  Helen Parish 
  Saana Saarteinen 
  Sabrina Santamaria 
  Rosalie van der Hoek

Champions

Men's singles 

  Tristan Lamasine def.  André Ghem, 6–3, 6–2

Women's singles 
  Lilla Barzó def.  Karen Barbat, 6–2, 6–4

Men's doubles 

  André Ghem /  Tristan Lamasine def.  Harri Heliövaara /  Patrik Niklas-Salminen, 7–6(7–5), 7–6(7–4)

Women's doubles 
  Nora Niedmers /  Hélène Scholsen def.  Cristina Ene /  Dea Herdželaš, 6–4, 7–6(7–5)

External links 
  

2015
2015 ATP Challenger Tour
2015 ITF Women's Circuit
Tennis tournaments in Finland
2015 in Finnish sport